Badiaga is a 1987 drama film directed by Jean-Pierre Dikongué Pipa and starring Justine Sengue and Alexandre Zanga.

Synopsis
Badiaga follows the rules of a classical tragedy: a three-year-old girl abandoned in a food market is sheltered and raised by a deaf and dumb vagrant. They develop a very strong bond. Badiaga dreams of becoming a famous singer and listens in total fascination to the artists who sing in the different cafes where she wanders.
One day she has the chance of singing on the radio a song which becomes a national hit. From that moment onwards she holds a nonstop succession of concerts. In love with her career, she refuses any romantic relations and searches desperately for her origins.
The story was inspired by the life of Beti Beti (Béatrice Kempeni), a legendary Cameroon singer.

Bibliography
Mbaku, John Mukum, Culture and customs of Cameroon, Greenwood Press, 2005

References

External links
Badiaga - IMDb page about Badiaga
Article (in French)  on  All Africa
Badiaga in Encyclocine
Badiaga in Africultures
Jean Pierre Dikongue-Pipa 
History of Cinema in Cameroon

Cameroonian drama films
1987 films
1987 drama films